Dear Sing Sing is a popular song, words by William Jerome, music by Jean Schwartz, first published in 1903. A popular singer of the time named Billy Murray recorded at least two versions in 1904, one for Edison Records and another for Victor Records. Both of these recordings are now public domain, and can be downloaded at several websites.

See also
Billy Murray (singer)
1903 in music
1904 in music

References

External links
 Website with two public domain versions by Billy Murray

1903 songs
Billy Murray (singer) songs
Songs with lyrics by William Jerome
Songs with music by Jean Schwartz